Palmadusta is a genus of sea snails, marine gastropod mollusks in the family Cypraeidae, the cowries.

Species
Species within the genus Palmadusta include:
Palmadusta androyensis Blocher & Lorenz, 1999
Palmadusta artuffeli (Jousseaume, 1876)
Palmadusta asellus (Linnaeus, 1758)
Palmadusta clandestina (Linnaeus, 1767)
Palmadusta contaminata (Sowerby I, 1832)   
Palmadusta diluculum (Reeve, 1845)  
Palmadusta humphreyii Gray, 1825
Palmadusta johnsonorum Lorenz, 2002
Palmadusta lentiginosa (Gray, 1825)
Palmadusta lutea (Gmelin, 1791)
Palmadusta saulae (Gaskoin, 1843)
Palmadusta ziczac (Linnaeus, 1758)
Species brought into synonymy 
 Palmadusta barbieri Raybaudi, 1986: synonym of Purpuradusta barbieri (Raybaudi, 1986) (original combination)
 Palmadusta consanguinea Blöcher & Lorenz, 2000: synonym of Palmadusta androyensis consanguinea Blöcher & Lorenz, 2000
Palmadusta felina (Gmelin, 1791): synonym of Melicerona felina (Gmelin, 1791)
Palmadusta fimbriata (Gmelin, 1791): synonym of Purpuradusta fimbriata (Gmelin, 1791)
Palmadusta gracilis (Gaskoin, 1849): synonym of Purpuradusta gracilis (Gaskoin, 1849)
 Palmadusta humphreysii (Gray, 1825): synonym of Palmadusta humphreyii (Gray, 1825) (Incorrect original spelling, see taxonomic note)
Palmadusta pseudolutea Ma, 1997: synonym of Palmadusta saulae (Gaskoin, 1843)
Palmadusta punctata (Linnaeus, 1771): synonym of Ransoniella punctata (Linnaeus, 1771)
 Palmadusta serrulifera F. A. Schilder & M. Schilder, 1938: synonym of Purpuradusta serrulifera (F. A. Schilder & M. Schilder, 1938) (original combination)

References

External links
 Iredale, T. (1930). Queensland molluscan notes, No. 2. Memoirs of the Queensland Museum. 10(1): 73-88, pl. 9

Cypraeidae